The Battle of Werbicze (or Werbka) was fought during the Palej Uprising between the Polish–Lithuanian Commonwealth and the insurgent Cossacks on February 4, 1703. Polish–Lithuanian Commonwealth forces under the command of Józef Potocki defeated the Cossacks forces which were supported by the Moldavian cavalry.

References
 Marek Wagner, Walki polsko-kozackie na prawobrzeżnej Ukrainie w latach 1702-1704 {w} STUDIA I MATERIAŁY DO HISTORII WOJSKOWOŚCI Tom XL, Białystok 2003.

Werbicze
Werbicze
Werbicze
1700s in Ukraine
History of Khmelnytskyi Oblast